Pine forest may refer to:

 A forest of Pine trees
Temperate coniferous forest, a terrestrial habitat type defined by the World Wide Fund for Nature
 Pine Forest, Texas, a city in Orange County, Texas, U.S.
 Pine Forest Charter School, in Flagstaff, Arizona, U.S.
 Pine Forest High School, in Pensacola, Florida, U.S.
Pine Forest High School (North Carolina), in Fayetteville, U.S.

See also

Pine (disambiguation)